A rickshaw is a pedestrian-powered vehicle for carrying one or two passengers.

Rickshaw may also refer to:

Vehicles

Human powered
 Cycle rickshaw (pedal-powered)
 Pulled rickshaw (pedestrian-powered)

Motorized
 Auto rickshaw
 Electric rickshaw

Related
 Rickshaw Run, an biannual charity rally in India and Nepal
 Rickshaw Sightseeing Bus, a Hong Kong tourism service
 Rickshaws in the United States

Artwork
 Rickshaw art
 Rickshaw art in Bangladesh

Films and novels
 Rickshaw Boy, a novel by the Chinese author Lao She
 Rickshaw Boy, a 1982 Chinese movie based on the eponymous novel
 Rickshaw Driver, a 1971 Tamil movie
 Rickshaw Mama, a 1992 Tamil movie
 Rickshaw Man, a 1958 Japanese movie, remake of the eponymous 1943 original

Music
 Crash Rickshaw, an American rock band
 Crash Rickshaw (album), by the eponymous band

Other uses
 Rickshaw Inn, a hotel in New Jersey, US

See also
 Rick Shaw (disambiguation)
 Boda-boda, an African bicycle or motorcycle taxi